Sconser is a small crofting township on the island of Skye, in Scotland, situated on the south shore of Loch Sligachan. The main A87 road of Skye passes through Sconser and the ferry to Raasay departs from the pier.

Immediately to the south is Glamaig which can be climbed via An Coileach (The Cockerel). Sconser was the birthplace of the professional climber John Mackenzie (1856–1933) after whom Sgurr Mhic Choinnich (Mackenzie's Peak) is named.

The settlement of Peinachorran lies on a northeasterly direction across the loch.

Gallery

Populated places in the Isle of Skye
Protected areas of Highland (council area)